Nightingale of India may refer to:

Sarojini Naidu, political activist and poet (1879–1949)
Lata Mangeshkar, playback singer and occasional music composer (1929–2022)